Tuiharpalus is a genus of beetle in the family Carabidae, endemic to New Zealand, where it occurs only in Northland and on the Three Kings Islands.

Species
 Tuiharpalus clunieae Larochelle & Larivière, 2005
 Tuiharpalus crosbyi Larochelle & Larivière, 2005
 Tuiharpalus gourlayi (Britton, 1964)
 Tuiharpalus hallae Larochelle & Larivière, 2005
 Tuiharpalus moorei Larochelle & Larivière, 2005

Gallery

References

Harpalinae